The Samsung Galaxy A72 is a mid-range Android-based smartphone developed and manufactured by Samsung Electronics. The phone, announced alongside the Galaxy A52 at Samsung's virtual Awesome Unpacked event on 17 March 2021, serves as the successor to the Galaxy A71. The Galaxy A72 retains many of the features its previous iteration, but also includes an upgraded 5,000 mAh battery, IP67 water and dust resistance, and the inclusion of an 8 MP telephoto camera.

Specifications

Design 
Galaxy A72 has a similar design with its predecessor. It has a Infinity-O display with a cutout for the front-facing camera just like the Galaxy A71. However, the device has matte color options rather than the glossy gradient finishes on the Galaxy A71. It is available with Awesome Black, Awesome White, Awesome Violet and Awesome Blue color options. The display is protected by Corning Gorilla Glass 3 while the frame and back panel is made of plastic. It has IP67 water and dust resistance.

Hardware 
Galaxy A72 is powered by Qualcomm Snapdragon 720G SoC with 8 nm process, an octa-core CPU comprising a high performance cluster with 2x 2.3 GHz Kryo 465 Gold cores and a high efficiency cluster with 6x 1.8 GHz Kryo 465 Silver cores and Adreno 618 GPU, and paired with 6 or 8 GB RAM and 128 GB internal storage. The SoC powering the Galaxy A72 is slightly better in single core CPU benchmarks than the SoC of the predecessor Galaxy A71, Qualcomm Snapdragon 730G (one of the chipset versions of Galaxy A71) and Qualcomm Snapdragon 730 (original chipset of Galaxy A71).

Galaxy A72 has a 6.7 inch Super AMOLED display with 800 nits maximum brightness, 20:9 aspect ratio, 1080x2400 resolution, ~393 ppi pixel density and 90 Hz refresh rate. The display also has a punch hole for the front-facing camera. 

Galaxy A72 has a quad rear camera setup with a 64 MP main camera with optical image stabilization (OIS), a 12 MP wide-angle camera, an 8 MP telephoto camera with optical image stabilization and 3x optical (lossless) zoom and a 5 MP depth sensor. The phone is capable of zooming up to 30x and has a 32 MP front-facing camera. The rear camera setup also includes an LED flash.

Galaxy A72 has Bluetooth 5.0, Wi-Fi 802.11 a/b/g/n/ac, a 3.5mm headphone jack, and NFC. It has a 5000 mAh non-removable battery with 25W fast charging support. There is a 25W charger in the box unlike the Galaxy A52 shipping with a 15W charger.

Galaxy A72 has stereo speakers, an under-display fingerprint sensor and a hybrid Dual-SIM slot (Nano-SIM/MicroSD card combo).

Software 

 Android 11 out of the box with One UI 3/3.1
 Will be upgraded to Android 12 with One UI 4.0
 Will get security updates. Security updates, however, are not monthly updates as it used to be for A71 or is for A52. It is currently in the quarterly update schedule of Samsung Security Website.

References 

Samsung Galaxy
Mobile phones introduced in 2021
Android (operating system) devices
Samsung mobile phones
Phablets
Mobile phones with multiple rear cameras
Mobile phones with 4K video recording